Vyacheslav Mykhaylovych Svidersky (born 1 January 1979) is a former Ukrainian football defender.

Career
He was a part of Ukraine's 2006 World Cup squad. He played 3 games in the World Cup, where he was booked for all three games. In 2009 Slava signed a six-month contract with Tavriya as a free agent from Dnipro.

References

External links
Profile at Official FC Dnipro website

1979 births
Sportspeople from Kyiv
Living people
Ukrainian footballers
Association football defenders
FC Spartak Vladikavkaz players
FC Dynamo Moscow players
FC Saturn Ramenskoye players
FC Obolon-Brovar Kyiv players
FC Chornomorets Odesa players
FC Shakhtar Donetsk players
SC Tavriya Simferopol players
FC Arsenal Kyiv players
Ukrainian Premier League players
Russian Premier League players
2006 FIFA World Cup players
Ukraine international footballers
FC Dnipro players
Ukrainian expatriate footballers
Expatriate footballers in Russia